Ein Naqquba is an Arab village in central Israel. Located west of Jerusalem, it falls under the jurisdiction of Mateh Yehuda Regional Council. In  it had a population of ..

History

The village was established in 1962 by refugees from the village of Bayt Naqquba, which had been depopulated during the 1948 Arab–Israeli War and whose lands had become Beit Nekofa. It was part of Ein Rafa until 1976, when it was recognised as a separate village.

Gallery

References

Arab villages in Israel
Populated places established in 1962
Populated places in Jerusalem District
1962 establishments in Israel